BU08028 is a drug which acts as a potent partial agonist at both the μ-opioid receptor and nociceptin receptor. It is a homologue of buprenorphine extended by just one carbon on the side chain, but has relatively greater activity at the nociceptin receptor, which is thought to reduce the abuse potential without compromising analgesia.

See also 
 BU-48
 BU72

References 

Mu-opioid receptor agonists
Heterocyclic compounds with 6 rings
Oxygen heterocycles
Nitrogen heterocycles
Cyclopropanes
Alcohols